Mountain View High School in unincorporated Pima County, Arizona is one of the two high schools in the Marana Unified School District. It opened in 1986, ten years after Mesa's high school with the same name. (The two Mountain Views are Arizona's only two district high schools that share a name.)

Notable alumni
Jared Lee Loughner, mass murderer in the 2011 Tucson shooting
James MacPherson, football player
Lacey Nymeyer, Olympic swimmer
Demetrius Flannigan-Fowles, NFL player
Jeff Cotton (American football), NFL player

References

External links 

 

Public high schools in Arizona
Schools in Pima County, Arizona
1986 establishments in Arizona
Educational institutions established in 1986